Renaldo Antonio Turnbull (born January 5, 1966) is a former professional American football defensive end and outside linebacker who played for the New Orleans Saints of the National Football League Was the Saints 1st round (14th overall) in the 1990 NFL Draft. Turnbull, a 6'5", . linebacker-defensive end from West Virginia University, played 8 seasons in the NFL from 1990-1997 for the Saints and Carolina Panthers. In his NFL career, Turnbull played in 120 games with 45.5 sacks and one interception.

College career
Turnbull is often considered one of the best pass-rushers in West Virginia football history, earning all-ECAC honors during his career.

Sophomore (1987)
In his sophomore season of 1987, Turnbull recorded 13 tackles and a pass break-up.

Junior (1988)
In 1988, Turnbull teamed up with Chris Haering, Steve Grant, Theron Ellis, and Lonnie Brockman to make up one of the greatest linebacking corps in school history. The team went undefeated, but lost in the Fiesta Bowl to Notre Dame for the national championship. Turnbull, recorded 73 tackles and a career and team-high 12 sacks as switching from linebacker to defensive end positions at times.

Senior (1989)
In his senior season of 1989, Turnbull recorded 67 tackles, two forced fumbles, eight sacks, and a career-high 11 tackles for a loss.

Professional career
Turnbull was selected in the 1990 NFL Draft in the 1st round, 14th overall by the New Orleans Saints. He is one of only nine West Virginia Mountaineers selected in the first round of the NFL Draft. As a rookie in 1990, Turnbull had nine sacks.

In 1993, Turnbull recorded 13.0 sacks and an interception. He was a Pro Bowl selection that season, which was the best in his career.

In his final three seasons as a Saint, Turnbull recorded 6.5, 7, and 6.5 sacks, respectively. In his final NFL season, 1997, Turnbull only recorded one sack while playing for the Carolina Panthers.

External links
 Database Football

1966 births
Living people
American football linebackers
New Orleans Saints players
Carolina Panthers players
National Conference Pro Bowl players
West Virginia Mountaineers football players
United States Virgin Islands players of American football
People from Saint Thomas, U.S. Virgin Islands